Never Before is a compilation album previously unreleased tracks and rarities, released digitally only in July 2011 by Australian rock band, Cold Chisel.
The album didn't impact the official ARIA Charts, but peaked at number 22 on the iTunes chart.

Track listing

References

2011 albums
Cold Chisel albums
Self-released albums